Sanfotsi, also written as Sanfoqi, was a trading polity in Southeast Asia mentioned in Chinese sources dated from the Song dynasty circa 12th century. In 1918, George Cœdès concluded that Chinese forms of San-fo-ts'i (Sanfoqi), Fo-ts'i (Foqi), Fo-che (Foshi), Che-li-fo-che (Shilifoshi), which correspond to Arabic Sribuza and can be reconstructed as Śribhoja, are names referring to the Srivijaya empire, located in Palembang, South Sumatra, in present-day Indonesia.

Others argued that Sanfotsi is more likely a transliteration of Suvarnabhumi, which may refer to Suvarnadvipa or Sumatra.

According to Chinese sources, Sanfotsi was an empire that controlled many territories in the strait of Malacca, eastern Sumatra and the Malay Peninsula. It was purportedly a large thalassocracy ruled by a high-king exercising sovereignty over several states that were dependencies of Sanfotsi. Although some considered Sanfotsi to refer to Palembang proper, recent scholars say its territorial extent was more vast.

Accounts
Sanfotsi as a state is recorded in many accounts, the majority of which are from Chinese sources such as the Chinese annals Chu-fan-chi written by Chau Ju-kua, and Ling-wai tai-ta by Chou K'u-fei. Excerpts here translated by Hirth and Rockhill:

Hsin-Tang-shu
This Tang dynasty chronicle Hsin-Tang-shu mentioned that the envoy of Mo-lo-yu (Melayu Kingdom) came to Chinese court in 644–645. While the envoy of Shih-li-fo-shih (Srivijaya) came for the first time in 670.

Chu-fan-chi

Ling-wai-tai-ta

Interpretations
The established theory has concluded that Sanfotsi is identical to Srivijaya. Srivijaya was written in older Chinese sources as Shi-li-fo-shi (室利佛逝, also shortened as fo-shi) which is an approximate phonetic rendering, but changed to San-fo-qi at the end of the Tang dynasty. San means "three" in Chinese, therefore the term can be read as "the three vijayas"; this has been suggested as Chinese recognition that it was not a centralized empire at some time in its history.

Ling-wai-tai-ta mentioned that in the years of 1079, 1082, and 1088 the country of Chan-pi (Jambi) located in Sanfotsi sent envoys to China. In the 12th century, Shi-li-fo-shi (Srivijaya) only twice sending envoys to China; 1156 and 1178. The equation of Shi-li-fo-shi (Srivijaya or Palembang) with Sanfotsi is quite problematic, since Chu-fan-chi mentioned that Palembang was one of the vassal states that belongs to Sanfotsi. While on the other hand Jambi or Malayu was not mentioned as Sanfotsi's vassal. This could mean that at that time Sanfotsi was centered in Jambi or Malayu, not in Palembang. Sanfotsi is more likely a transliteration of Suvarnabhumi, which rever to Suvarnadvipa or Sumatra. Thus the kingdom was Suvarnabhumi (Sanfotsi or Sumatra) while the capital was shifted between Palembang (Shi-li-fo-shi or Srivijaya) and Jambi (Chan-pi or Mo-lo-yu).

However, other historians tried to locate it somewhere else. Filipino historian Paul Kekai Manansala suggested that Sanfoqi refers to it was a Prehispanic Philippine state name Sambali. He argued that the accounts suggests that Sanfotsi was located to the south of China, and was, in fact, due south of the port of Ts'uan-chou. Since the Philippines is the only area exactly and directly due south of the port of Ts'uan-chou and has several place names such as Lingmayon (Lingayen) and Poni (Panai) that may fit some of the place names in the account, it therefore may fit the description.

Some Thai historians, such as Chand Chirayu Rajani, while agreeing with the designation of Sanfoqi with Srivijaya, argued that it refers to Chaiya in Thailand rather than Palembang.

See also
 Zabag kingdom

References

Hindu Buddhist states in Indonesia
Former countries in Malaysian history
Former empires in Asia
Srivijaya
Former countries in Thai history
Former countries in Philippine history
History of the Philippines (900–1565)